Little Miss Rebellion is a 1920 American silent comedy drama film directed by George Fawcett and written by Harry Carr and Wells Hastings. The film stars Dorothy Gish, Ralph Graves, George Siegmann, Riley Hatch, and Marie Burke. The film was released on September 19, 1920, by Paramount Pictures. It is not known whether the film currently survives.

Plot
As described in a film magazine, the young Grand Duchess Marie Louise (Gish) of Molvenia, weary of life among the aristocracy, eagerly welcomes the relief that comes with the acquaintance of American soldiers that camp near her castle. She singles out Sergeant Richard Ellis (Graves) for her attentions, and he is supremely happy in his love for her until her identity is revealed. Before he can readjust their friendship, his troops leave for home and he bids her goodbye. Then comes the Bolshevik revolution that dethrones her and makes her flee with trusted servant Stephen (Hatch) to America. Turning flapjacks in a restaurant window, she finds Richard again. However, Bolsheviks track her down, desiring the crown jewels she brought with her, but are bested by Richard and Stephen. With this victory comes word from abroad that her throne once again awaits her.

Cast
Dorothy Gish as Grand Duchess Marie Louise
Ralph Graves as Sgt. Richard Ellis
George Siegmann as Col. Moro
Riley Hatch as Stephen
Marie Burke as Lady-in-Waiting

References

External links 
 
 Film still at IMDb

1920 films
1920 comedy-drama films
Paramount Pictures films
American black-and-white films
American silent feature films
1920s English-language films
1920s American films
Silent American comedy-drama films